Paul Warren may refer to:

Paul Warren (actor) (born 1974), British actor
Paul Warren (cricketer) (born 1978), English cricket player
Paul Warren (musician) (born 1953), American guitar player
Paul Warren (Actor)  (born 1966), American actor stage and screen